The Nikon S4 is a rangefinder camera produced by Nikon that was very similar to the Nikon S3 but had a slightly lower price. This was because it used a cloth shutter curtain (rather than titanium foil curtains) and it lacked the self-timer and motor drive lug of the S3. The viewfinder frame-line for 35mm lenses was also omitted. In all other respects, the cameras were identical.

The camera had a short production run of less than 6,000 units from 1958 to 1960 which makes it rare compared to the other Nikon rangefinders; however not as rare as the Nikon 1 or Nikon M models.  The Nikon S4 was not exported to the United States.

See also
Nikon
Nikon I, M and S
Nikon SP

References

External links
 Nikon Rangefinder Cameras

S
135 film cameras
S